The 2018–19 Mizoram Premier League is the seventh season of the Mizoram Premier League, the top division football league in the Indian state of Mizoram. The league kicked off from 6 September 2018 with eight teams competing. 

Aizawl FC won its 3rd title.

Teams
 Aizawl
 Bethlehem Vengthlang FC
 Chanmari
 Chawnpui FC
 Chhinga Veng
 Electric Veng FC
 Mizoram Police 
 Ramhlun North FC

Standings

Finals

Semi-finals

Leg 1

Leg 2

Final

Statistics

Scorers
Source: goalie365.com
1 goals
  L.Lalnuntluanga (Chanmari)
 Lalrosanga (Chanmari)
 Lalnuntluanga (Chhinga Veng)
 Lalnunzama (Ramhlun North FC)

 Zosangliana (Chhinga Veng)
  Laldingngheta (Ramhlun North FC)

  Waheed Adekunle (Ramhlun North FC)
 Jonathan Lalhriatkima (Bethlehem)
 Ansumana Kromah (Aizawl)
 F Lalrintluanga (Electric Veng)
 John Anpong (Ramhlun North FC)
 Vanrammawia Ngente (Chawnpui)
 Lalfakawma (Mizoram Police)
 Remsanga (Electric Veng)
 Lalruatfela (Chawnpui)
 Albert Zohmingmawia (Aizawl)
 Lalhriatrenga (Aizawl)
 Fela Zote (Aizawl)
 C Lalnuntluanga (Bethlehem)
 Lalmuanzova (Bethlehem)
 MC Malsawmzuala (Chanmari)
 B. Zoramthara (Mizoram Police)
 K Lalnunpuia (Bethlehem)
 C Vanlalhmangaihaa (Bethlehem)
 Immanuel HS Lalthazuala (Chanmari)
 Vanlalbiaa Chhangte (Chanmari)
 F Lalremsanga (Aizawl)
 K Lalthlahlova (Chhinga Veng)
 Lalhlimpuia (Chawnpui)
 Lalfakzuala (Mizoram Police)
 Jessy Vanlalmuana (Ramhlun North FC)
 R Lalthanmawia (Electric Veng)
 R Lalremsanga (Electric Veng)
 Faka (Electric Veng)
 Hmingthanmawia (Chhinga Veng)

2 goals
 Lalramtharmawia (Mizoram Police)
  F Lalrinpuia (Mizoram Police)
  C Lalrintluanga (Bethlehem)
 Mark Zothanpuia (Chanmari)
 Laldinliana Varte (Bethlehem)
 David Laltlansanga (Chawnpui)
 Lalrinfela  (Aizawl)
 PC Vanlalhruaia (Bethlehem)
 Eric Lalsangzuala (Mizoram Police)
 Lalrammawia (Chhinga Veng)
 Rochharzela (Aizawl)
 Jerry F Zonunsanga (Chawnpui)
 Lalremruata (Ramhlun North FC)
 K Lalhmangaihkima (Aizawl)
 Jacob Lalrawngbawla (Chhinga Veng)
 Isak Vanlalruatfela (Aizawl)
 H. Lalhlimpuia (Bethlehem)
 Gatch Arthure Diomande (Chhinga Veng)
 R. Malsawmtluanga (Mizoram Police)

3 goals
  Alfred Jaryan (Aizawl)
 Lalromawia (Chhinga Veng)
 Lalramtharmawia (Mizoram Police)
 Lalbiakhlua (Mizoram Police)
 Lalkhawpuimawia (Aizawl)
 Malsawmfela  (Mizoram Police)

4 goals

 Isak Vanlalpeka (Electric Veng)
 F.Lalremsanga (Aizawl)
 Lalnunmawia (Ramhlun North FC)
 Laldampuia (Chanmari)

5 goals
 

6 goals

 David Lalchhuanawma (Electric Veng)
 Vanlalthanga (Chawnpui)
 Lalnunzama (Chanmari FC)
 Lalfakzuala (Mizoram Police)

7 goals

  MS Dawngliana (Chhinga Veng)

Own Goal
  Alfred Jaryan (Aizawl)
 Thomas Lalthlamuana (Chawnpui)

Assists

Clean sheets

References

External links
 Mizoram Premier League on facebook

Mizoram Premier League
2018–19 in Indian football leagues
Football in Mizoram